The Qajar dynasty was an Iranian royal dynasty of Turkic origin, specifically from the Qajar tribe, ruling over Iran from 1789 to 1925. The Qajar family took full control of Iran in 1794, deposing Lotf 'Ali Khan, the last Shah of the Zand dynasty, and re-asserted Iranian sovereignty over large parts of the Caucasus. In 1796, Mohammad Khan Qajar seized Mashhad with ease, putting an end to the Afsharid dynasty, and Mohammad Khan was formally crowned as Shah after his punitive campaign against Iran's Georgian subjects. In the Caucasus, the Qajar dynasty permanently lost many of Iran's integral areas to the Russians over the course of the 19th century, comprising modern-day eastern Georgia, Dagestan, Azerbaijan and Armenia.
Iran’s international trade developed speedily during the Qajar dynasty. From 1800 and 1914, the total value of imports and exports was estimated to have grown from some 2.5 million to 20 million pounds sterling (at 2015 rates).

Qajar Shahs of Iran, 1789–1925

Qajar imperial family

The Qajar Imperial Family in exile is currently headed by the eldest descendant of Mohammad Ali Shah, Sultan Mohammad Ali Mirza Qajar, while the Heir Presumptive to the Qajar throne is Mohammad Hassan Mirza II, the grandson of Mohammad Hassan Mirza, Sultan Ahmad Shah's brother and heir. Mohammad Hassan Mirza died in England in 1943, having proclaimed himself shah in exile in 1930 after the death of his brother in France.

Today, the descendants of the Qajars often identify themselves as such and hold reunions to stay socially acquainted through the Kadjar (Qajar) Family Association, often coinciding with the annual conferences and meetings of the
International Qajar Studies Association (IQSA). The Kadjar (Qajar) Family Association was founded for a third time in 2000. Two earlier family associations were stopped because of political pressure. The offices and archives of IQSA are housed at the International Museum for Family History in Eijsden.

Titles and styles
The shah and his consort were styled Imperial Majesty. Their children were addressed as Imperial Highness, while male-line grandchildren were entitled to the lower style of Highness; all of them bore the title of Shahzadeh or Shahzadeh Khanoum.

Qajar dynasty since 1925
 Heads of the Qajar Imperial Family
The headship of the Imperial Family is inherited by the eldest male descendant of Mohammad Ali Shah.
 Sultan Ahmad Shah Qajar (1925–1930)
 Fereydoun Mirza (1930–1975)
 Sultan Hamid Mirza (1975–1988)
 Sultan Mahmoud Mirza (1988)
 Sultan Ali Mirza Qajar (1988–2011)
 Sultan Mohammad Ali Mirza (2011–present)

 Heirs Presumptive of the Qajar dynasty
The Heir Presumptive is the Qajar heir to the Persian throne.

 Sultan Ahmad Shah Qajar (1925–1930)
 Mohammad Hassan Mirza (1930–1943)
 Fereydoun Mirza (1943–1975)
 Sultan Hamid Mirza (1975–1988)
 Mohammad Hassan Mirza II (1988–)

Notable members

 Politics
 Prince Abdol-Hossein Farmanfarma (1859–1939), prime minister of Iran
 Mohammad Mosaddegh, prime minister of Iran and nephew of Prince Abdol Hossein Mirza Farmanfarma.
 Prince Firouz Nosrat-ed-Dowleh III (1889–1937), son of Prince Abdol-Hossein Farmanfarma, foreign minister of Iran
 Hossein Khan Sardar (1740–1830), last ruler of the Erivan Khanate administrative division
 Amir Abbas Hoveyda, Iranian economist and politician, prime minister of Iran from 1965 to 1977, a Qajar descendant on his maternal side
 Ali Amini, prime minister of Iran
 Prince Iraj Eskandari, Iranian communist politician
 Princess Maryam Farman Farmaian (b. 1914–d. 2008) Iranian communist politician, founder of the women's section of the Tudeh Party of Iran
 Ardeshir Zahedi (b. 1928–d. 2021) Iranian diplomat, Qajar descendant on his maternal side.
 Prince Sabbar Farmanfarmaian, health minister in Mosaddeq cabinet
 Abdol-Hossein Sardari (1914–1981), Consul General at the Iranian Embassy in Paris 1940–1945; helped and saved the lives of Jews in danger of deportation by issuing them with Iranian passports. A Qajar Qoyunlu and through his mother a grandson of Princess Malekzadeh Khanoum Ezzat od-Doleh, the sister of Nasser ed-Din Shah.
Aga Khan III (1877–1957), President of the League of Nations from 1937 to 1938, one of the founders and the first president of the All-India Muslim League and the 48th Imam of the Nizari Ismaili Muslims.

 Military
 Prince Amanullah Mirza Qajar, Imperial Russian, Azerbaijani, and Iranian military commander
 Prince Feyzulla Mirza Qajar, Imperial Russian and Azerbaijani (ADR) military commander
 Prince Aleksander Reza Qoli Mirza Qajar, Imperial Russian military leader, commander of Yekaterinburg (1918)
 Prince Amanullah Jahanbani, senior Iranian general
 Nader Jahanbani, general and vice-deputy chief of the Imperial Iranian Air Force

 Social work
 Princess Sattareh Farmanfarmaian, Iranian social work pioneer

 Business
 Princess Fakhr-ol-dowleh

Religion

 Aga Khan IV (1936–), the 49th and current Imam of Nizari Ismailism, a denomination of Isma'ilism within Shia Islam.

 Women's rights
 Princess Mohtaram Eskandari, intellectual and pioneering figures in Iranian women's movement.
 Dr. Iran Teymourtash (Légion d'honneur) (1914–1991), journalist, editor and publisher of the newspaper Rastakhiz, founder of an association for helping destitute women. Daughter of court minister Abdolhossein Teymourtash and through both her maternal grandparents a Qajar.

 Literature
 Prince Iraj (1874–1926), Iranian poet and translator
 Princess Lobat Vala (b. 1930), Iranian poet and campaigner for the Women Liberation
 Shahrnush Parsipur, Iranian novelist, a Qajar descendant on her maternal side
 Sadegh Hedayat, a Qajar descendant through the female line
 Dr. Anvar Khamei, the Iranian economist, politician, and sociologist.

 Entertainment
 Gholam-Hossein Banan, Iranian musician and singer, Qajar descendant on his maternal side.

Family tree

Mothers of Qajar Shahs

See also
 Abdolhossein Teymourtash
 Austro-Hungarian military mission in Persia
 Bahmani family
 History of Iran
 History of the Caucasus
 Khanates of the Caucasus
 List of kings of Persia
 List of Shi'a Muslims dynasties
 Mirza Kouchek Khan
 Qajar art
 Qajar Iran

Notes

Citations

Sources
 
 
 
 
 
 
 
 
 
 
 
 
 
 Gvosdev, Nikolas K.: Imperial policies and perspectives towards Georgia: 1760–1819, Macmillan, Basingstoke 2000, 
 Lang, David M.: The last years of the Georgian Monarchy: 1658–1832, Columbia University Press, New York 1957

External links

 The Qajar (Kadjar) Pages
 The International Qajar Studies Association
 Dar ol-Qajar
 Qajar Family Website
 Some Photos of Qajar Family Members
 Women's Worlds in Qajar Iran Digital Archive by Harvard University
 Qajar Documentation Fund Collection at the International Institute of Social History

 
1785 establishments in Iran
1925 disestablishments in Iran

Middle Eastern dynasties
Shia dynasties